The Société des Chemins de fer Léopoldville-Katanga-Dilolo (LKD) was a railway concession owner in the Congo Free State, Belgian Congo.
The network was built, maintained and operated by the Compagnie du chemin de fer du bas-Congo au Katanga (BCK).

History

The Société des Chemins de fer Léopoldville-Katanga-Dilolo (LKD) was created through a 16 September 1927 agreement between the government and BCK, and was an administrative and financial vehicle. 
The government was its main shareholder, and granted it concessions for the three lines: Bukama–Port-Francqui, Tenke–Dilolo and Port-Francqui–Léopoldville.
Construction and operation of the lines was subcontracted to BCK.
BCK was responsible for all the track, and operated the network and equipment as a whole.
The  line from Tenke to Dilolo was completed in 1931.
At Dilolo the BCK network connected to the Benguela railway, which carried goods to the port of Lobito on the Atlantic.

In 1952 LKD merged with Compagnie de Chemin de fer du Katanga CFK to form the Compagnie des Chemins de fer Katanga-Dilolo-Léopoldville (KDL).
KDL held the rail network concessions in Katanga, while BCK was the operator.

Network

 Dilolo - Tenke,
 Dilolo - Kasaji,, opened | June 1930 
 Kasaji - Manika, Kolwezi,, opened 10 March 1931
 Divuma – Kisenge mines,, opened in 1931, branch line

See also
 Rail transport in the Democratic Republic of the Congo

Citations

Sources

 

Railway companies of the Belgian Congo
1927 establishments in the Belgian Congo
1952 disestablishments in the Belgian Congo